The 2016 AFC U-19 Championship was the 39th edition of the AFC U-19 Championship, the biennial international youth football championship organised by the Asian Football Confederation (AFC) for the men's under-19 national teams of Asia. The tournament was hosted by Bahrain, as announced by the AFC on 3 June 2015, and was scheduled to be played between 13–30 October 2016. A total of 16 teams played in the tournament.

Same as previous editions, the tournament acted as the AFC qualifiers for the FIFA U-20 World Cup. The top four teams of the tournament qualified for the 2017 FIFA U-20 World Cup in South Korea as the AFC representatives, besides South Korea who qualified automatically as hosts. If South Korea were among the top four teams, three play-off matches would be played to decide the fifth-placed team which also qualify for the 2017 FIFA U-20 World Cup; however, this was not necessary as South Korea were eliminated in the group stage.

Japan conquered the title for the first time after beating Saudi Arabia in the final's penalty shootout, and also set a record in the competition for being the first team to win the tournament without conceding a single goal.

On 25 October 2016, the AFC President, Salman Al-Khalifa, congratulated Saudi Arabia, Vietnam, IR Iran and Japan on qualifying for the FIFA U-20 World Cup 2017. The four teams will join hosts South Korea to make up Asia's five representatives at the tournament.

Qualification

The draw for the qualifiers was held on 5 June 2015. A total of 43 teams were drawn into ten groups, with the ten group winners and the five best runners-up qualifying for the final tournament, together with Bahrain who qualified automatically as hosts but also competed in the qualifying stage.

The qualifiers were played between 28 September – 6 October 2015.

Qualified teams
The following 16 teams qualified for the final tournament.

1 As South Vietnam

Venues
The tournament is played in two venues:

Draw
The draw for the final tournament was held on 30 April 2016, 19:00 AST (UTC+3), in Manama. The 16 teams were drawn into four groups of four teams. The teams were seeded according to their performance in the previous edition in 2014.

Squads

Players born on or after 1 January 1997 are eligible to compete in the tournament. Each team can register a maximum of 23 players (minimum three of whom must be goalkeepers).

Group stage
The top two teams of each group advance to the quarter-finals.

Tiebreakers
The teams are ranked according to points (3 points for a win, 1 point for a draw, 0 points for a loss). If tied on points, tiebreakers are applied in the following order:
Greater number of points obtained in the group matches between the teams concerned;
Goal difference resulting from the group matches between the teams concerned;
Greater number of goals scored in the group matches between the teams concerned;
If, after applying criteria 1 to 3, teams still have an equal ranking, criteria 1 to 3 are reapplied exclusively to the matches between the teams in question to determine their final rankings. If this procedure does not lead to a decision, criteria 5 to 9 apply;
Goal difference in all the group matches;
Greater number of goals scored in all the group matches;
Penalty shoot-out if only two teams are involved and they are both on the field of play;
Fewer score calculated according to the number of yellow and red cards received in the group matches (1 point for a single yellow card, 3 points for a red card as a consequence of two yellow cards, 3 points for a direct red card, 4 points for a yellow card followed by a direct red card);
Drawing of lots.

All times are local, AST (UTC+3).

Group A

Group B

Group C

Group D

Knockout stage
In the knockout stage, extra time and penalty shoot-out are used to decide the winner if necessary.

Bracket

Quarter-finals
Winners qualified for 2017 FIFA U-20 World Cup.

Semi-finals

Final

Winners

Awards
Most Valuable Player
 Ritsu Dōan

Top Scorer
 Sami Al-Najei

Fair Play

Goalscorers
4 goals

 Sami Al-Najei
 Abdulrahman Al-Yami

3 goals

 Reza Jafari
 Waleed Kareem Ali
 Yuto Iwasaki
 Koki Ogawa
 Rakan Al-Anaze

2 goals

 Mohammed Al-Hardan
 Abolfazl Razzaghpour
 Mazin Fayyadh
 Shunta Nakamura
 Ayman Al-Khulaif
 Cho Young-wook
 Doston Ibrokhimov

1 goal

 George Blackwood
 Mario Shabow
 Liam Youlley
 Ahemd Bughammar
 Sayed Ebrahim
 Mohamed Marhoon
 Ahmed Mohamed
 Talal Al Naar
 Aref Aghasi
 Reza Karamolachaab
 Mehdi Mehdikhani
 Reza Shekari
 Sajad Hussein
 Alaa Abbas Abdulnabi
 Ritsu Dōan
 Teruki Hara
 Takeru Kishimoto
 Koji Miyoshi
 Takehiro Tomiyasu
 Han Kwang-song
 Ryang Hyon-ju
 Abdulrasheed Umaru
 Abdulelah Al-Amri
 Abdulrahman Ghareeb
 Mansour Al-Muwallad
 Han Chan-hee
 Jeong Tae-wook
 Kang Ji-hoon
 Kim Geon-ung
 Nuriddin Hamroqulov
 Ehson Panjshanbe
 Karomatullo Saidov
 Anon Amornlerdsak
 Supachai Jaided
 Sittichok Phaso
 Faisal Al Matroushi
 Husain Abdulla Omar
 Ahmed Rashed
 Jassem Yaqoub
 Bobur Abdukhalikov
 Sayidjamol Davlatjonov
 Jasurbek Yakhshiboev
 Hà Đức Chinh
 Hồ Minh Dĩ
 Đoàn Văn Hậu
 Trần Thành

1 own goal

 Abolfazl Razzaghpour (against Qatar)

Tournament team rankings

Qualified teams for U-20 World Cup
The following five teams from AFC qualified for the 2017 FIFA U-20 World Cup, including South Korea which qualified as hosts.

1 Bold indicates champion for that year. Italic indicates host for that year.

References

External links
, the-AFC.com

 
2016
U-19 Championship
2016
U-19
October 2016 sports events in Asia
2016 in youth association football